Viscount  was a field marshal in the Imperial Japanese Army.

Biography
Kawamura was born in Kagoshima in the Satsuma han feudal domain (present day Kagoshima prefecture. He first fought as a samurai in the Anglo-Satsuma War. He was part of the Satsuma forces in the Boshin War to overthrow the Tokugawa Shogunate. After the Meiji Restoration he was appointed commander of the Imperial Guards. He also served as field commander in the suppression of various insurrections during the early years of the Meiji era, including the Hagi Rebellion and the Satsuma Rebellion.

Kawamura led his Imperial Guards Division in the First Sino-Japanese War and went to the front in Taiwan as field commander. On the conclusion of that war, he was ennobled by Emperor Meiji with the title of danshaku (baron) under the kazoku peerage system.

In the Russo-Japanese War of 1904-1905, Kawamura succeeded Prince Fushimi Sadanaru as commander of the Japanese 10th Division, and served notably as field commander at the Battle of Yalu River (1904). In January 1905, being promoted to General, he was appointed Commander of the Japanese Fifth Army and took part in the Battle of Mukden. After Japan's victory, Emperor Meiji elevated him to the title of shishaku (viscount).

After the war, Kawamura served as chief of the Tokyo Garrison, and in 1915 he became a field marshal.

His Japanese decorations included the Order of the Golden Kite (1st class), Order of the Rising Sun (1st class with Paulownia Blossoms, Grand Cordon) and the Grand Cordon of the Supreme Order of the Chrysanthemum.

Kawamura's grave is at Aoyama Cemetery in Tokyo. His daughter married Hideyoshi Obata, who served as a general in the Imperial Japanese Army during World War II.

Notes

References

 Jansen, Marius B. and Gilbert Rozman, eds. (1986). Japan in Transition: from Tokugawa to Meiji. Princeton: Princeton University Press. ;  OCLC 12311985
  . (2000). The Making of Modern Japan. Cambridge: Harvard University Press. ;  OCLC 44090600
 Keene, Donald. (2002). Emperor of Japan: Meiji and His World, 1852-1912. New York: Columbia University Press. ; OCLC 46731178

External links

Marshals of Japan
People of the Boshin War
People from Satsuma Domain
1850 births
1926 deaths
Samurai
Kazoku
Japanese military personnel of the First Sino-Japanese War
Japanese military personnel of the Russo-Japanese War
Japanese generals
People of Meiji-period Japan
Shimazu retainers
Recipients of the Virtuti Militari
Recipients of the Order of the Rising Sun
Recipients of the Order of the Golden Kite
People of the Satsuma Rebellion
People from Kagoshima